John Fawcett (died 1793) was an actor who played at the Theatre Royal in Drury Lane as well as in Dublin and on several occasions at the Theatre Royal in Richmond.  He is best known today for having fathered a rather more famous actor of the same name.

References
"Performances at Richmond's Theatre Royale: 15 June 1765." London Borough of Richmond upon Thames. 10 October 2008.  (accessed October 22, 2008).

See also
John Fawcett (actor).

1793 deaths
British male stage actors
Year of birth unknown
18th-century British male actors